Mount Anne is a mountain located in the Southwest National Park in south-west region of Tasmania, Australia. The mountain lies within the UNESCO World Heritage-listed Tasmanian Wilderness.

It dominates the area surrounding Lake Pedder.

Location and features

Although a primarily dolerite structure, it has a large sub-structure of dolomite, which contains an extensive cave system. This system includes the famous 'Anna-a-Kananda' cave — one of the deepest caves in Australia. Several cavers have been killed trying to explore its depths.

Mount Anne has a superb region of ancient Gondwanan-type vegetation on its north-east ridge, some of which are amongst the oldest surviving plant species on the planet.

History 
Mount Anne was named by George Frankland after his wife, Georgina Anne in 1835. Henry Judd reached the Mount Anne Plateau from the Huon Valley in 1880. Walter Crookall and Geoff Chapman, members of the Hobart Walking Club found a way to the top on 25 December 1929. The long hike from Maydena or Huonville became a day-walk after the construction of the Scotts Peak Dam Road in 1970.

A hut was constructed on the nearby Mt Eliza by the Hobart Walking Club in 1974 to ease access to the mountain.

Mount Anne is a common bushwalking destination for experienced walkers, the Mount Anne circuit is a 4-day walk that can include summiting Mount Anne.

Gallery

See also

List of highest mountains of Tasmania

References

External links

 Parks Tasmania

Anne
South West Tasmania